The following is a list of all stations on the Central Railroad of New Jersey, including the line they were on, the date service began and ceased, and notes on the station's current status.

Main Line

Perth Amboy & Elizabethport Branch and New York & Long Branch RR

At Elizabethport, the Jersey Central's Perth Amboy & Elizabethport Branch split from the Main Line and ran as far as South Amboy, where it became the New York and Long Branch Railroad. The NY&LB ran as far as Bay Head Junction, NJ and was owned and operated jointly by the CNJ and PRR.  At Woodbridge Jct, the Pennsylvania Railroad's Perth Amboy & Woodbridge Branch from the mainline at Rahway met the Perth Amboy & Elizabethport and the PRR had trackage rights south to the NY&LB.

Freehold Branch
South from Matawan, the CNJ operated the following stations:

Seashore Branch
East from Matawan, the CNJ operated the following stations:

Newark and New York Railroad

The Newark and New York Railroad opened in 1869 and ran between the CRRNJ Terminal and Broad Street in Newark

South Branch

Southern Division
In 1917, the CNJ took over the New Jersey Southern Railroad.  It was along this trackage that the CNJ operated its most famous train, The Blue Comet, which ran from Jersey City to Winslow Junction, and then along The Reading Co's Atlantic City Railroad trackage to Atlantic City.  South from Red Bank, the CNJ operated the following stations:

Bibliography

References

 
Central Railroad of New Jersey
Central Railroad of New Jersey